Annabelle is a feminine given name of French origin, a combination of the Latin name Anna, which comes from the Hebrew word for grace, and the French word belle, meaning beauty. The name means favored grace. 

Notable people with this given name includes:

 Annabel Linquist, American artist, musician, and entrepreneur, known as Bel
 Annabelle Apsion, British actress
 Annabel Astor, Viscountess Astor, English socialite
 Annabel Chong, Stage name of Singaporean-born American pornographic film actress called Grace Quek
 Annabelle Chvostek, Canadian singer/songwriter
 Annabelle Cripps, British swimmer
 Annabel Croft, tennis player
 Annabel Elliot, English interior designer and antiques dealer, sister of Camilla, Duchess of Cornwall
 Annabelle Ewing, Scottish politician
 Annabel Giles, writer
 Annabel Morris Holvey (1855–1910), American newspaper editor, social reformer
 Annabel Langbein, New Zealand chef
 Annabel Goldie, Scottish politician
 Lady Annabel Goldsmith, English socialite
 Annabel Lamb, singer
 Annabel Lyon, writer
 Annabelle Lyon (dancer)
 Annabel Miguelena, Panamanian writer and actress
 Annabel Mullion, English actress
 Annabel Port, radio presenter
 Annabelle Rama (born 1952), Filipina actress
 Annabelle Rankin, Australian politician
 Annabel Young, former New Zealand politician
 Annabel (Japanese singer) 
 Annabelle (singer), French singer and actress
 Annabell, stage name for Anna Sedokova, Ukrainian actress and singer
 Annabel Digance, Australian politician

Fictional characters 
 Annabel Lee in the poem "Annabel Lee" by Edgar Allan Poe
 Annabel, a stage name for Evelyn Draper in the film Play Misty for Me
 Annabelle, a calf-turned-reindeer in the animated Christmas movie Annabelle's Wish Annabelle, a whippet angel in the animated film series All Dogs Go To Heaven Annabel Greene, a character in Just Listen (novel) by Sarah Dessen
 Annabelle, supernatural doll in The Conjuring  horror film series
Annabel Banks, youngest of the five Banks children in the Mary Poppins series. Born in the second book, Mary Poppins Comes Back''

See also
 Anabel, given name
 Anabelle, given name
 Annabel (disambiguation)
 Anabelle Lee (disambiguation)

References

English feminine given names
Feminine given names